New Hope is a census-designated place (CDP) in Lowndes County, Mississippi, United States. As of the 2010 census, the CDP population was 3,193.

Geography
New Hope is located in eastern Lowndes County at  (33.446624, -88.324967).

Creeks draining the community flow west to the Tombigbee River.

Demographics

2020 census

As of the 2020 United States Census, there were 3,161 people, 1,247 households, and 1,110 families residing in the CDP.

2010 census
As of the 2010 United States Census, there were 3,193 people living in the CDP. 87.8% were White, 11.2% African American, 0.2% Native American, 0.2% Asian, 0.1% from some other race and 0.6% of two or more races. 1.0% were Hispanic or Latino of any race.

2000 census
As of the census of 2000, there were 1,964 people, 669 households, and 576 families living in the CDP. The population density was 814.8 people per square mile (314.6/km). There were 695 housing units at an average density of 288.3/sq mi (111.3/km). The racial makeup of the CDP was 93.28% White, 5.96% African American, 0.10% Native American, 0.10% Asian, and 0.56% from two or more races. Hispanic or Latino of any race were 0.15% of the population.

There were 669 households, out of which 49.6% had children under the age of 18 living with them, 73.4% were married couples living together, 10.6% had a female householder with no husband present, and 13.9% were non-families. 11.8% of all households were made up of individuals, and 3.9% had someone living alone who was 65 years of age or older. The average household size was 2.93 and the average family size was 3.18.

In the CDP, the population was spread out, with 31.3% under the age of 18, 6.7% from 18 to 24, 31.9% from 25 to 44, 23.0% from 45 to 64, and 7.1% who were 65 years of age or older. The median age was 35 years. For every 100 females, there were 96.8 males. For every 100 females age 18 and over, there were 92.9 males.

The median income for a household in the CDP was $54,375, and the median income for a family was $60,909. Males had a median income of $40,089 versus $26,875 for females. The per capita income for the CDP was $25,153. About 4.4% of families and 5.5% of the population were below the poverty line, including 4.8% of those under age 18 and 13.4% of those age 65 or over.

Education
New Hope is served by the Lowndes County School District.

New Hope Schools are consolidated on one campus. New Hope elementary is split into two buildings, one housing grades K-2 and the other housing grades 3–5. New Hope Middle contains grades 6–8; while New Hope High School houses 9-12.

Sports championships began with the Lady Trojan basketball team with two state championships. The New Hope Lady Trojan Slowpitch softball team has won ten state championships, including six consecutive from 2000 to 2006. The Trojan baseball team has won five state championships with one being a perfect 43–0 record. New Hope High School has also won a Class 4A Golf Championship and in 2008 won the Boy's Class 4A Basketball Championship.

References

Census-designated places in Lowndes County, Mississippi
Census-designated places in Mississippi